Mitja Leskovar (born 3 January 1970) is a Slovenian priest of the Catholic Church who has been named a titular archbishop and appointed Apostolic Nuncio to Iraq. He has worked in the diplomatic service of the Holy See since 2001.

Biography 
Mitja Leskovar was born in Kranj, Slovenia, on 3 January 1970 and grew up in Kokrica. He entered the seminary in Ljubljana in 1989, where he earned a degree in theology. He was ordained a priest of the Diocese of Ljubljana on 29 June 1995 from archbishop Alojzij Šuštar. After two years of pastoral work in Domžale, he continued his studies in Rome. He completed his master's degree in 1999 and earned a doctorate in canon law at the Pontifical Gregorian University.

He joined the diplomatic service of the Holy See on 1 July 2001. His early assignments included stints in Bangladesh from 2001 to 2003, the General Affairs Section of the Secretariat of State in Rome from 2003 to 2014, Germany from 2015 to 2018, and India from 2018 to 2020.

While working in Rome in 2012, he was tasked with reforming Vatican security procedures after Pope Benedict XVI's butler was arrested for allegedly leaking documents to an Italian journalist. This included adding enhanced security features to employee badges, new restrictions on physical access, and managing the handling of sensitive documents.

On 1 May 2020, Pope Francis appointed him titular archbishop of Beneventum and Apostolic Nuncio to Iraq. He is one of three Slovenians active in the Vatican's diplomatic corps.

The date of his consecration as bishop was unscheduled because of the COVID-19 pandemic until 8 August 2020. He was consecrated by Cardinal Franc Rodé, co-consecrators the archbishop Stanislav Zore and the archbishop Jean-Marie Antoine Joseph Speich.

Honours
   Officer's Cross of the Order of Merit of the Federal Republic of Germany, 25 July 2019

See also
 List of heads of the diplomatic missions of the Holy See

References

Living people
1970 births
People from Kranj
Pontifical Gregorian University alumni
Apostolic Nuncios to Iraq
Officers Crosses of the Order of Merit of the Federal Republic of Germany
Diplomats of the Holy See
Pontifical Ecclesiastical Academy alumni